Ferihegy railway station is a railway station on the southeastern edge of Budapest, Hungary. Hungarian State Railways runs suburban and long-distance services between this station and Nyugati Railway Station in Budapest city centre through Kőbánya-Kispest.

It is located adjacent to the now-closed Terminal One of Budapest Ferihegy International Airport (now Budapest Ferenc Liszt International Airport). The Airport's Terminal Two is approximately 4 km away, and connected to the station by bus 200E.

References

 

Railway stations in Budapest